Sri Lanka competed at the 2011 World Aquatics Championships in Shanghai, China. Sri Lanka sent 3 athletes to these championships.

Swimming

For the first time ever qualification standards were put in place, which meant smaller countries such as Sri Lanka could only send wild cards (2 male and 1 female). The three swimmers were selected after selection trials at the Police Pool in Colombo in April 2011.

Men

Women

References

2011 in Sri Lankan sport
Nations at the 2011 World Aquatics Championships
Sri Lanka at the World Aquatics Championships